Tmesisternus breuningi is a species of beetle in the family Cerambycidae. It was described by E. Forrest Gilmour in 1950. It is known from Papua New Guinea.

References

breuningi
Beetles described in 1950